Salt Publishing is an independent publisher whose origins date back to 1990 when poet John Kinsella launched Salt Magazine in Western Australia.  The journal rapidly developed an international reputation as a leading publisher of new poetry and poetics.  Over the next decade, Kinsella, together with Tracy Ryan, went on to develop Folio(Salt), publishing and co-publishing books and chapbooks focused on a pluralist vision of contemporary poetry which extended across national boundaries and a wide range of poetic practices.

Noted for awarding the Crashaw Prize, named in honour of 17th-century metaphysical poet Richard Crashaw.

Overview

In 1999 John Kinsella, Clive Newman and Chris Hamilton-Emery formed a partnership to develop Salt Publishing. When Newman left in 2002 and the original partnership was dissolved, Jen Hamilton-Emery, a senior manager in the National Health Service, joined Chris Hamilton-Emery to take over the ownership of Salt, relaunching the business in the UK. Since that time Salt has rapidly expanded its size and the range of its publishing programme.  In November 2004, Salt was incorporated in the UK and Linda Bennett (ex-Waterstone's) joined as a director. In July 2005, John Skelton joined as a director.

Chris Hamilton-Emery was given an editor's award for excellence in literature in the 2006 American Book Awards.

In 2007 Salt was shortlisted for an innovation award in the inaugural UK Independent Publishing Awards, though Faber & Faber won the category. In 2008 Salt was shortlisted again for the 2008 Nielsen Innovation of the Year award, and won it.

From its offices in Cromer on the north Norfolk coast, Salt now publishes around 14 works of British fiction each year.

References

External links
Salt Publishing
Chris Emery

Small press publishing companies
Book publishing companies of the United Kingdom
Publishing companies established in 1990